"Jumpin on a Jet" is a song by American rapper Future, released as the second single from his seventh studio album The Wizrd on January 9, 2019. It was produced by Southside.

Composition
Winston Cook-Wilson called the song an "upbeat trap anthem featuring some unpredictable flows from the rapper and a catchy vocal sample". Future sings about his lifestyle of jewelry, lean and most notably, flying on a private jet.

Critical reception
Tom Breihan of Stereogum compared the song to Future's previous single "Crushed Up", writing,  "Where 'Crushed Up' was generic Future, the new 'Jumpin On A Jet' is something closer to peak-capacity Future. It's still an example of the man operating within his comfort zone — Auto-Tuned melodies, moody trap beat, vaguely soul-destroyed conspicuous-consumption lyrics. But it shows us a Future with more energy and urgency than usual, and it's got hooks working for it, too."

Music video
The music video was uploaded on YouTube on January 8, 2019, the day before the single was released. Directed by Colin Tilley, the video shows with Future climbing a ladder into the heavens and hijacking a plane with a crew. They proceed to throw the cargo out and embark on an expedition to another planet. Future is seen rapping on the other planet, and performing along with a group of "lovely female dancers".

Charts

Certifications

References

2019 singles
2019 songs
Future (rapper) songs
Songs written by Future (rapper)
Songs written by Southside (record producer)
Song recordings produced by Southside (record producer)
Music videos directed by Colin Tilley